Crocanthes triglenopa is a moth in the family Lecithoceridae. It was described by Edward Meyrick in 1929. It is found on New Guinea.

Lepidoptera and Some Other Life Forms gives this name as a synonym of Crocanthes symmochlopa Meyrick, 1929.

References

Moths described in 1929
Crocanthes